Mariana Costa (born 14 October 1992) is a Brazilian handballer for Debreceni VSC and the Brazilian national team.

Achievements
Romanian League: 
Bronze Medalist: 2018 
Danish League:
Winner: 2017
Austrian League:
Winner: 2015
Austrian Cup:
Winner: 2015
EHF Cup:
Semifinalist: 2017
World Championship:
Winner: 2013
Pan American Championship:
Winner: 2017

Individual awards 
Women's International Tournament of Spain Top Scorer: 2018
South and Central American Women's Handball Championship Top Scorer: 2018

References

External links

1992 births
Living people
Brazilian female handball players
Expatriate handball players
Brazilian expatriate sportspeople in Austria
Brazilian expatriate sportspeople in Denmark
Brazilian expatriate sportspeople in Romania
Handball players from São Paulo
South American Games gold medalists for Brazil
South American Games medalists in handball
Competitors at the 2018 South American Games
Handball players at the 2019 Pan American Games
Pan American Games medalists in handball
Pan American Games gold medalists for Brazil
Medalists at the 2019 Pan American Games
20th-century Brazilian women
21st-century Brazilian women